Philpott is a rural locality in the North Burnett Region, Queensland, Australia.

History 
Philpott Central State School opened on 6 August 1913. It closed circa 1948. It was on a  site off Shallcross Road.

References 

North Burnett Region
Localities in Queensland